UniSport Australia (UniSport) is the national body of university sports in Australia. They are responsible for the Australian team at the International University Sports Federation events.

Competitions

UniSport Nationals

The UniSport Nationals is the flagship multi-sport competition of UniSport. It is held annually in Australia, with forty-three Australian universities participating in the competition. Since its inception, seven universities have won the overall champion title; University of Sydney (12), University of Melbourne (6), Monash University (3), University of Queensland (2), University of Technology Sydney (2), University of Western Australia (1) and University of Wollongong (1).

Nationals Snow
The National Snows is the main multi-sport competition for sports played on snow.

Indigenous Nationals

The Indigenous Nationals is the main multi-sport competition for Indigenous Australians.

Leagues

University Basketball League
It was  planned to create the University Basketball League (UBL) for 2020 but it was postponed due to the COVID-19 outbreak. The UBL resumed for the 2021 season.

Women’s Uni 7s Series

The Women's Uni 7s Series established in 2017 is the main Rugby sevens league for women in Australia.

University Rugby League 9's
In 2019 the first edition of the University Rugby League 9's was held. Both the men's and women's division won the University of Newcastle.

References

External links 
 

 
Sports governing bodies in Australia